Casper Højer Nielsen (born 20 November 1994) is a Danish professional footballer who plays as a left back for Czech First League club Sparta Prague.

He has been capped 15 times for the Denmark national under-18 and under-19 teams, respectively.

Club career

Early years
Højer Nielsen, whose father Lars had played professional football himself for B 1903 and their successor club FC Copenhagen, among others, was trained in the academy of FC Copenhagen. In July 2013, he sent on loan within the city to the second-tier Danish 1st Division club Brønshøj Boldklub from the Brønshøj district to player under head coach Bo Henriksen. On 28 July 2013, he played his first senior game in the 4–1 defeat away against Silkeborg IF. At Brønshøj, he was utilised regularly and after a year he moved to Brønshøj's second division competitor Lyngby Boldklub from Lyngby-Taarbæk Municipality in the urban area of Copenhagen. Whereas he would play most games during his first season, Højer Nielsen only appeared in nine games in his second year at Lyngby. Nevertheless, he promoted with the club in the Danish Superliga.

AGF
Having not played a lot in his first season in the Superliga with Lyngby either, and the situation would not improve in his second year where Lyngby had qualified for the UEFA Europa League, he signed with AGF in the winter transfer window of the 2017–18 season. Originally, he was supposed to move to the Aarhus-based club on a three-year deal in the summer of 2018, but the clubs eventually reached an agreement to send him to his new club in February 2018. There, Højer Nielsen fought for a regular place and helped secure the club's survival in the Superliga relegation round. On 16 September 2018, he scored his first goal for the club in the 2–3 away win over AC Horsens to win the game. In the following season, 2019–20, Højer Nielsen was a regular starter at the left-back position.

Sparta Prague
On 9 May 2021, it was announced that Højer Nielsen had signed with Czech First League club Sparta Prague for an undisclosed fee, reported to be €700,000. His contract with AGF had been set to expire in December 2021.

International career
Højer Nielsen played nine games for the national under-18 team from 2011 to 2012, in which he scored three goals. He would then play at the side of, among others, Yussuf Poulsen for the under-19 team a year later, where he gained six caps and scored one goal.

Personal life 
He is the son of former professional football player Lars Højer Nielsen.

Career statistics

References

1994 births
Living people
Danish men's footballers
Denmark youth international footballers
Danish Superliga players
Danish 1st Division players
F.C. Copenhagen players
Brønshøj Boldklub players
Lyngby Boldklub players
Aarhus Gymnastikforening players
Association football defenders
Footballers from Copenhagen
AC Sparta Prague players
Danish expatriate sportspeople in the Czech Republic
Czech First League players
Expatriate footballers in the Czech Republic